Chua Bonhuaa (1920 – 20 February 1976) was a Chinese basketball player. He competed in the men's tournament at the 1948 Summer Olympics.

References

External links
 

1920 births
1976 deaths
Chinese men's basketball players
Olympic basketball players of China
Basketball players at the 1948 Summer Olympics
Place of birth missing
Sportspeople from Taipei
Republic of China men's national basketball team players